Manuel Jesús Pedreros Guevara (born 17 July 1954) is a Chilean former footballer who played as a midfielder for clubs in Chile and Colombia.

Club career
As a child, Pedreros was with Industrial F.C. from Concepción, Chile. At professional level, he played for Naval, Iberia, Cobresal and Mulchén Unido.

A historical player of Cobresal between 1982 and 1988, he took part in the 1986 Copa Libertadores and won both the 1983 Segunda División and the 1987 Copa Lan Chile.

Abroad, he played for Colombian side Deportivo Cali in 1986.

International career
Pedreros made one appearance for the Chile national team in a match against Brazil on 9 December 1987.

Personal life
He is the older brother of the also former Chile international footballer, . His son of the same name, played for Deportes Concepción and Fernández Vial, coinciding with his brother, Leonel, in 1995.

References

External links
 
 
 Manuel Pedreros at PlaymakerStats.com

1954 births
Living people
Sportspeople from Concepción, Chile
Chilean footballers
Chilean expatriate footballers
Chile international footballers
Naval de Talcahuano footballers
Deportes Iberia footballers
Cobresal footballers
Deportivo Cali footballers
Chilean Primera División players
Primera B de Chile players
Categoría Primera A players
Tercera División de Chile players
Chilean expatriate sportspeople in Colombia
Expatriate footballers in Colombia
Association football midfielders